WNEL (1430 AM) is a radio station broadcasting a News, Sports and Spanish Oldies format. Licensed to Caguas, Puerto Rico, it serves the Puerto Rico area.  The station is currently owned by Turabo Radio Corporation. The station is rebroadcast on translator station W241CW 96.1 FM also located in Caguas.

Translator stations

External links

NEL
Radio stations established in 1947
1947 establishments in Puerto Rico
Caguas, Puerto Rico
Oldies radio stations